Ilan Halevi ; ; born Georges Alain Albert in France; 12 October 1943 – 10 July 2013) was a French-Israeli Jewish pro-Palestinian journalist and politician, and one of the very few high-ranking Jewish members of the Palestine Liberation Organization (PLO). He was a member of the Palestinian delegation in the 1991–93 negotiations in Madrid and Washington, and was Assistant Deputy Minister for Foreign Affairs in the Palestinian Government. Writing in both French and English, he was also a novelist and the author of non-fiction books, his publications including The Crossing (1964), Face à la guerre (2003), and Allers-retours (2005).

Biography

Background
He was born to a Jewish family in Lyon, France, in 1943, "under a false name ... in a post-office that was a Resistance hide-out", as his older brother Marc Albert has confirmed. After the death of their father Henri Levin (who had been born in Poland to Russian-Jewish parents), his mother Blanche married Emile Albert and he adopted her four children. (Some sources mistakenly state that his father was a Yemeni Jew whose family had settled in Jerusalem at the beginning of the 20th century; according to Halevi's brother Marc, when Halevi went to Israel "he obtained a passport with the testimony of a Yemenite residing there – the reason that this origin is sometimes given as his.")

Literary beginnings
In the early 1960s he had work published in the literary journals Les Temps modernes and Présence Africaine. His first novel, The Crossing, published in 1964 was favourably reviewed, described by Lillian Smith in The Saturday Review as "a brilliant, mind-smacking account of a young man's journey from nowhere to hell....a fresh way of looking at the multileveled agony of the walled-in young."

Political life
Following visits to Africa, including to Mali and Algeria, in 1965, at the age of 22, Halevi moved to Israel. He is quoted as having said: "I came to Israel because in Algeria I discovered the importance of the Palestinian problem. I sat there in coffee houses, I heard people, I spoke with intellectuals and I understood that the Palestinian question preoccupies the people of the Arab world. It is really in the center of their obsessions. I decided I want to study this reality up close and from the inside…I wanted to study the Israeli reality." Halevi joined the Palestinian resistance movement and Fatah in particular after the 1967 Arab-Israeli war, and subsequently became a prominent member of the PLO. He was the PLO's representative in Europe and to the Socialist International since 1983, former PLO vice-minister of Foreign Affairs, and participated in that capacity in the Madrid Conference of 1991. He was also a member of the Fatah Revolutionary Council, elected in 2009, and served as an adviser to Yasser Arafat.

According to Hanan Ashrawi (in This Side of Peace), in the early 1970s, Halevi was a member of Ma'avak (Struggle), a "small, radical Israeli anti-Zionist group". In the wake of the 1973 Yom Kippur War, and subsequent shift of Palestinian activism into the Occupied Territories, he switched his activity to groups which included Israelis and Palestinians working together against the occupation, and helped secure permission for Bashir Barghouti, a Palestinian activist and member of the Jordanian Communist Party's governing council, to return to the West Bank.

Halevi was a critic of Zionism, and wrote several books on the subject. He was a founding member of the Revue des Études palestiniennes (Palestinian Studies Review) in 1981. Halevi lived in Paris and the West Bank, and described himself as "100% Jewish and 100% Arab." In a 2011 interview he said: "My father fought against the Nazi occupation of France as a Communist. I follow in the tradition of my parents in the fight for freedom and justice, even for oppressed Jews. Given a second chance, I would live my life exactly the same way. In my 45 years as a member of the PLO, I have always been accepted as a Jew."

He was awarded the Medal of Distinction for his role in support of the Palestinian struggle by President Mahmoud Abbas.

Death and legacy
Halevi died in Clichy on 10 July 2013 at the age of 69. His funeral took place in Paris at the crematorium of Père Lachaise Cemetery.

In April 2019 it was announced that through an initiative of President Abbas a new street in the city of Al-Bireh would be named in honour of Ilan Halevi, a decision described by Hanan Ashrawi as "a tribute to a person of courage and principle".

Bibliography 
 Alain Albert, The Crossing (novel), New York: George Braziller, Inc., 1964; London: Heinemann, 1965. French translation by Georges Levin as La traversée, Paris: Éditions du Seuil, 1965.
 Sous Israël, la Palestine, Paris: Le Sycomore, 1978; Minerve, 1987.
 Israël, de la terreur au massacre d'Etat, Paris: Papyrus, 1984.
 Question juive: la tribu, la loi, l'espace, Paris: Editions de Minuit, 1981. Translated into English by A. M. Berrett as A History of the Jews: Ancient and Modern, London: Zed Books, 1987, . Published in German as Auf der Suche nach dem gelobten Land: Die Geschichte der Juden und der Palastma-Konflikt, Hamburg: Junius, 1986. Reissued as Jewish Question: Tribe, Law and Space, Syllepse Editions, 2016.
 Face à la guerre. Lettre de Ramallah, Paris: Sindbad/Actes Sud, 2003, .
 Allers-retours, Paris: Flammarion, 2005, . A semi-autobiographical novel critical of Israel and its policies toward the Palestinians.
 Du souvenir, du mensonge et de l'oubli: Chroniques palestiniennes. Paris: Actes Sud, 2016. .

Further reading
 Yezid Sayigh, Armed Struggle and the Search for State: The Palestinian National Movement, 1949–1993, Oxford University Press, 1999.
 Lutz Fiedler, Matzpen. A History of Israeli Dissidence, Edinburgh University Press, 2020, pp. 231–240.

References

External links 

 Ilan Halevi, Le droit du peuple palestinien à lutter contre l’occupation 
 Ilan Halevi, "Encore une fois à propos du sionisme et de l'antisémitisme", 2003. 
 Jean-Pierre Perrin, "Ilan Halevi, l'âme en paix", Libération, 10 July 2013. 
 Ofer Aderet, "Ilan Halevi, Jewish member of the Palestine Liberation Organization, dies in Paris", Haaretz, 10 July 2013.
 AFPS, "Avec Ilan Halévi, nous venons de perdre un ami de toujours", Association France Palestine Solidarité, 10 July 2013.
 Pierre Haski, "Mort d’Ilan Halevi, intellectuel engagé, '100% juif et 100% arabe'", Rue 89, 11 July 2013.
 Michel Warschawski, "Ilan Halevi (1943-2013)", Alternative Information Center (AIC), 11 July 2013.
 Ben Lynfield (Jerusalem), "Fatah pays tribute to Ilan Halevi - an Israeli Jew who ‘defected’ to the PLO", The Independent, 11 July 2013.
 Margaret Busby, "Ilan Halevi: Jewish author, journalist and politician who rose to prominence in the PLO" (obituary), The Independent, 25 July 2013.
 "Ilan Halevy" (obituary), The Telegraph, 12 August 2013.
 Nicole Lapierre, "Ilan Halévi, métèque générique", Vagabondages Sociologiques (blog), Mediapart, 13 July 2013. 
 Farouk Mardam-Bey, "Ilan Halevi: Palestinian Jew and Citizen of the World, 1943–2013", Journal of Palestine Studies, Vol. 43, No. 4 (Summer 2014), pp. 67–70.
 Ella Habiba Shohat, "A Voyage to Toledo: Twenty-Five Years After the 'Jews of the Orient and Palestinians' Meeting", Jadaliyya, 30 September 2014.

1943 births
2013 deaths
20th-century French Jews
French emigrants to Israel
French political writers
French socialists
Jewish activists
Jewish socialists
Jews in the State of Palestine
French male novelists
Palestine Liberation Organization members
20th-century French novelists
20th-century French male writers
Fatah members
Jewish anti-Zionism in Israel
Anti-Zionism in France
Jewish Palestine Liberation Organization members
21st-century French novelists